Events during the year 2015 in Northern Ireland.

Incumbents
 First Minister - Peter Robinson
Acting First Minister - Arlene Foster (20 September - 31 October)
 deputy First Minister - Martin McGuiness 
 Secretary of State - Theresa Villiers

Events

January 

 1 January – New Year's Day (public holiday).

February 
 17 February – The Police Service of Northern Ireland received a phone call, allegedly from a dissident republican group, claiming to have planted an explosive in a Curryneirin neighborhood outside Derry. Police evacuated 12 homes before finding a device, saying, "It's a bomb and designed to kill".

March 

 11 March – A major fire occurred in Derry. The blaze broke out at around 12:50 GMT on the Queens Quay area of the city. One hundred and thirty fire fighters were at the scene. Major disruption was caused around the city but no-one was hurt.
 13 March – Northern Ireland faced its biggest strike yet with teachers, public transport, ambulance staff, civil servants, and others striking because of staff and budget cuts. It caused major disruption across the province.
 15 March – Mothering Sunday.
 17 March – Saint Patrick's Day (public holiday).
 29 March – Palm Sunday. Clocks went forward one hour when British Summer Time (BST) began.

April 

 1 April- Northern Ireland's brand new super councils came down from 26 to just 11.
 3 April – Good Friday (public holiday).
 6 April – Easter Monday (public holiday).
 15 April – A fishing boat, the Karen, with nets in the water, was dragged backwards rapidly in the Irish Sea, 30 kilometres from Ardglass, County Down, at the Calf of Man. The trawler was badly damaged but the four crew members were unhurt; they suspected they were dragged by a Russian submarine.

May 

 4 May – May Day and Labour Day (public holiday).
 25 May – Spring public holiday.

June 

 21 June – Father's Day.

July 

 12 July – Orangeman's Day (actual date).
 13 July – Orangeman's Day (observed). Marching season culminates in The Twelfth celebration of the Glorious Revolution and the Battle of the Boyne.

August 

 31 August – August public holiday.

October 

 25 October – Clocks go back one hour when British Summer Time (BST) ends.
 31 October – Hallowe'en.

December 

 25 December – Christmas Day (public holiday).
 26 December – Boxing Day (actual date).
 28 December – Boxing Day (observed).

Sports

Association football 

International friendly matches

 25 March – Scotland v Northern Ireland.

 Euro 2016 qualifiers

 29 March – Northern Ireland v Finland.
 13 June – Northern Ireland v Romania.
 4 September – Faroe Islands v Northern Ireland.
 7 September – Northern Ireland v Hungary.
 8 October – Northern Ireland v Greece.
 11 October – Finland v Northern Ireland.

Deaths

See also 
 2015 in England
 2015 in Scotland
 2015 in Wales

References 

Northern Ireland